Ross Johnson (born February 22, 1980) is a former professional lacrosse player and athlete for the San Jose Stealth.  He was originally from Mill Valley, California and was released by the Stealth after the 2005 season.

Statistics

NLL

References

1980 births
Living people
San Jose Stealth players
American lacrosse players